Alpha Kappa Nu was one of the first documented African-American collegiate fraternal organizations in the United States. Formed in 1903 at Indiana University and lasting until around 1905, it had a membership of 10, which included all the colored students at the school. A second chapter was set to be established at Wilberforce University.  Wilberforce University was where the fraternity Gamma Phi was founded in 1905.

History

Social club
In The Story of Kappa Alpha Psi: A History of the Beginning and Development of A College Greek Letter Organization 1911-1999, Historian Ralph J. Bryson recounted that his own fraternity "may have begun in 1903 on the campuses of Indiana University in Bloomington, IN, but there were too few registrants to assure continuing organization. That year, a club was formed called "Alpha Kappa Nu Greek Society"; though newspaper accounts from 1903 and 1905 identified the organization as a Greek fraternity with elected officers and a constitution with "plans of establishing branches at leading negro institutions," the club was never incorporated, and disappeared after a short time.  The group lasted for 14 months. Although the group was also stated to have lasted until 1911. The purpose of the group was to "strengthen the negro voice."   The group was listed as the first black college chapter to own its own house.

Kappa Alpha Psi
Bryson states that the original moniker (Kappa Alpha Nu) of Kappa Alpha Psi, which did become an African-American fraternity, may have been chosen in tribute to the short lived club.  However, there is no concrete evidence as to why the Greek letters Kappa Alpha Nu were chosen,(Kappa is the 10th letter of the Greek alphabet and there were 10 founders, Alpha as being the first Black frat at I.U., Nu unknown) and the name was later changed, due to an incident at an I.U. Track Meet involving Kappa Frank Summers, changing from Nu to Psi, which was also formed by the combined letters of I.U.(ψ)). Kappa Alpha Psi's historian credits the name change in 1915 with allowing their organization to "thereby became a Greek letter Fraternity in every sense of the designation."

See also
History of North American fraternities and sororities
List of African-American Greek and fraternal organizations

References

Student organizations established in 1903
Indiana University
African-American fraternities and sororities
Defunct fraternities and sororities
1903 establishments in Indiana